HMS Bacchus was a Dutch 10-gun schooner launched c.1806 that the British Royal Navy captured in 1807 and took into service in 1808 under her existing name. She served in several campaigns that earned her crews clasps to the Naval General Service Medal. She was broken up in 1812.

Career 1812
The Royal Navy commissioned Bachus in 1808 under Lieutenant Samuel Malbon. In early August Bacchus  sailed with a flag of truce to the Oronoque carrying a three-man delegation.

In 1809 Lieutenant Charles Deyman Jermy (or Jeremy) replaced Malbon. In February Jermy and Bacchus were at the invasion of Martinique. Four decades later the operation was among the actions recognised by the clasp "Martinique" attached to the Naval General Service Medal (NGSM), awarded upon application to all British participants still living in 1847.

A British squadron under Captain George Miller in  arrived at Deshaies on 12 December to reconnoiter the harbour. There they found the French navy's brig Nisus about to leave, having loaded a cargo of coffee. Miller sent in boats with the marines from  Thetis, and Bacchus, and 78 sailors. The landing party first captured the fort at Deshaies, whereupon Nisus surrendered when the landing party turned the fort's guns on herguns were turned on her. During the operation,  kept up a six-hour cannonade on Nisus and the battery. Many of the 300 men in the battery fled, as did most of the crew of Nisus before the British could take possession. The British destroyed the battery before withdrawing. British casualties amounted to two men from Thetis being wounded on shore, and two men being wounded on Attentive. The Royal Navy took Nisus into service as HMS Guadeloupe. In 1847 the Admiralty awarded the NGSM with clasp "13 Dec. Boat Service 1809" to all surviving claimants from the boat action.

Later, Bacchus repelled an attack by two French privateer schooners. In the attack the British had five men severely wounded.

Bacchus then participated in the capture of Guadeloupe. This led to the award in 1847 of the NGSM with clasp "Guadaloupe".

On two occasions Bacchus had to ward off attacks by French rowboats that approached her. She also captured some prizes.

Fate
Bacchus was broken up in 1812.

Notes

Citations

References
 
 

1800s ships
Captured ships
Schooners of the Royal Navy